Petr Šidlík (born January 18, 1994) is a Czech professional ice hockey player. He was play for Piráti Chomutov of the Czech Extraliga.

Šidlík made his Czech Extraliga debut playing with HC Karlovy Vary during the 2014-15 Czech Extraliga season.

References

External links

1994 births
Living people
Piráti Chomutov players
HC Karlovy Vary players
Victoriaville Tigres players
Czech ice hockey defencemen
Sportspeople from Jihlava
Czech expatriate ice hockey players in Slovakia
Czech expatriate ice hockey players in Canada